Richard James Lawson (born 20 October 1986) is a South African rugby union footballer, currently playing with Western Province Premier League side Hamiltons. His regular playing position is either full-back or wing.

After being released by Griquas at the end of 2013, Lawson played for club side Hamiltons, also representing them at the 2014 SARU Community Cup. He then returned to provincial rugby when he joined Wellington-based side  for the 2014 Currie Cup qualification tournament.

References

External links

itsrugby.co.uk profile

Living people
1986 births
South African rugby union players
Rugby union fullbacks
Rugby union wings
Griquas (rugby union) players
South African people of British descent
Rugby union players from Johannesburg
Western Province (rugby union) players
Hamilton RFC, Sea Point players
Alumni of Wynberg Boys' High School